The 2010 Central American and Caribbean Games Preliminary Round was a preliminary round contested by some CONCACAF teams that determined the qualified teams to the 2010 Central American and Caribbean Games. Six teams were drawn into 3 matchups that were contested in a two-legged tie. The first leg of each of the Preliminary Round matchups was played on March 21, 2010, and the second leg was played on March 27–28. Costa Rica did not participate in the first part, being the strongest team, they got an automatic spot into an extra playoff series against the best losing team of the two-legged series. Nicaragua, having the best result, played against Costa Rica. All 7 Central American associations took part of the qualifying process.

Matches 

|-
!colspan=7|Extra Playoff
|-

|}

First legs

Second legs 

 Panama won 3–0 on aggregate.

 El Salvador won 1–0 on aggregate.

 Belize 2–2 Nicaragua on aggregate. Belize won on away goals.

Playoff

 Costa Rica won 12–1 on aggregate.

External links
 

Football
Sports in Mayagüez, Puerto Rico